Creatonotos is a genus of tiger moths in the family Erebidae. The moths in the genus are found in the Afrotropics, South and East Asia, Sundaland and Australia.

Description
Palpi short and porrect. Hind tibia with one pair of sours. Forewings rather narrow. Forewings in some species with vein 10 from cell and vein 5 in both wings, sometimes from above angle of cell.

Species
The genus contains the following species:

Creatonotos sensu stricto
Creatonotos gangis (Linnaeus, 1763)
Creatonotos interrupta (Linnaeus, 1767)
Creatonotos leucanioides Holland, 1893
Creatonotos leucanioides albidior Wiltshire, 1986
Creatonotos omanirana de Freina, 2007
Creatonotos fasciatus (Candèze, 1927)
Cretonotos fasciatus pljustshi Dubatolov, 2010
Creatonotos perineti Rothschild, 1933
Creatonotos punctivitta (Walker, 1855)

Subgenus Phissama Moore, [1860] 1858-1859
Creatonotos kishidai Dubatolov & Holloway, 2007
Creatonotos transiens (Walker, 1855)
Creatonotos transiens albina (Daniel, 1971)
Creatonotos transiens koni Miyake, 1909
Creatonotos transiens sundana Nakamura, 1976
Creatonotos transiens vacillans (Walker, 1855)
Creatonotos wilemani Rothschild, 1933

References

 , 2007: A new species of the Creatonotos transiens-group (Lepidoptera: Arctiidae) from Sulawesi, Indonesia. Bonner zoologische Beiträge 55 (2): 113–121, Bonn.
 , 2007: Creatonotos omanirana sp. n. aus dem Oman und dem Iran (Artiidae: Arctiinae). Nota lepidopterologica 30 (2): 375–386, Dresden.
 , 2010: Beitrag zur afrotropische Arctiidaefauna: Bemerkungen und Korrekturen zum Artenspektrum der Genera Creatonotos Hübner, [1819], Afrowatsonius Dubatolov, 2006 und Dubatolovia gen. n. (Lepidoptera: Arctiidae, Arctiinae). Nachrichten des Entomologische Vereins Apollo 31 (1/2): 1–8.
 , 1999: Reporting of a new species under genus Creatonotos Hübner (Arctiinae: Arctiidae: Lepidoptera) from India. Entomon 24 (2): 135–141, University of Kerala: Kariavattom, Trivandrum, India.
 , 1976: Notes on the geographical variations of Creatonotos transiens Walker with descriptions of new species and two new subspecies (Lepidoptera: Arctiidae). Tyô to Ga. Transactions of the Lepidopterological Society of Japan 27 (3): 111–117.

Spilosomina
Moth genera